Clivina planiceps is a species of ground beetle in the subfamily Scaritinae. It was described by Jules Putzeys in 1863.

References

planiceps
Beetles described in 1863